The 1991 Kansas State Wildcats football team represented Kansas State University in the 1991 NCAA Division I-A football season.  The team's head football coach was Bill Snyder.  The Wildcats played their home games in KSU Stadium.  1991 saw the Wildcats finish with a record of 7–4, and a 4–3 record in Big Eight Conference play.

1991 saw the first winning season for Kansas State since 1982.  Kansas State recorded their first shutout of an opponent since September 20, 1975, when they shut out Wichita State at home.  The Wildcats shut out Missouri on November 16, 1991.

Schedule

Roster

Game summaries

at Washington

at Nebraska

Colorado

References

Kansas State
Kansas State Wildcats football seasons
Kansas State Wildcats footbal